Northern Guilford High School is a public high school located in Greensboro, North Carolina. It is situated in proximity to NC Highway 150, which connects to Browns Summit and to Summerfield.

It opened its doors to students on January 29, 2008.  The school was built because of the overcrowding of Northwest Guilford and Northeast Guilford high schools.

Athletics
In 2009, the Northern Basketball Team finished 30–3 and Won the 3A Title.  However, they were later stripped of their state title due to residency issues.

The Northern Men's Golf Team Won the 2010 3A State Title.
Northern Women's Golf Team 2011 & 2013 3A State Runner-Up
Northern Men's Track and Field Team 2011 3A State Runner-Up
Northern Men's Track and Field Team 2012 3A State Champion.

The Northern Guilford Nighthawks Football have won 3 consecutive 3AA State Championships, defeating Crest High School in 2010 and 2011 and Charlotte Catholic in the 2012 championship game. They have recently won the 2014 3AA State Championship as well, defeating Weddington High School.

In 2017, the Northern Guilford Women's Basketball team won the state championship.

In 2017, the Northern Guilford Baseball team won the state championship on Friday June 3, 2017 in Zebulon, N.C.

In 2020, the Northern Guilford wrestling team won the 3A NC Dual Team State Championship by defeating Enka HS. The Nighthawks defeated a favored Enka at the Greensboro Coliseum.

Notable alumni
Keenan Allen, professional football player, five-time Pro Bowl wide receiver with the Los Angeles Chargers
Elissa Cunane, professional basketball player
Maurice Harris, professional football player
T. J. Logan, professional football player
Chris McCain, professional football player
Tyler Yates, Professional footballer at averett university

References

External links
 School website
 Construction Video of Northern H.S., Nov., 2006

Public high schools in North Carolina
Schools in Greensboro, North Carolina